Northrup House may refer to:

Buildings

United States

Northrup House (Iola, Kansas)
Palmer-Northrup House, North Kingstown, Rhode Island
Clark-Northrup House, Sherborn, Massachusetts
Northrup-Gilbert House, Phoenix, New York

See also
Stephen Northup House, listed on the NRHP in North Kingstown, Rhode Island